Tairora  is a tribal group of people living in the Eastern Highlands of Papua New Guinea in or near the Aiyura Valley.  They are the traditional enemy of the Gadsup.

See also
Tairoa language

External links
SIL Ethnologue Listing on Tairora People and Language

Ethnic groups in Papua New Guinea
Tribes of Oceania